Colleen Lake is a small meltwater lake between the lower parts of Joyce Glacier and Garwood Glacier in Victoria Land on the continent of Antarctica. It was first seen on the ground by U.S. geologist Troy L. Pewe on January 14, 1958. He gave it the name "Colleen" because the feature is similar to many of the clear, reflecting lakes in Ireland.

References
 

Lakes of Victoria Land
Scott Coast